The 2001 ABC Championship qualification was held in late 2000 and early 2001 with the Gulf region, West Asia, Southeast Asia, East Asia and Middle Asia (Central Asia and South Asia) each conducting tournaments.

Qualification format
The following are eligible to participate:

 The organizing country.
 The five best-placed teams from the previous ABC Championship.
 The two best teams from the sub-zones.

1999 ABC Championship

Qualified teams

* Withdrew

East Asia
All the others withdrew, so  and  qualified automatically.

Gulf
The 2000 Gulf Basketball Association Championship is the qualifying tournament for the 2001 ABC Championship.  won the tournament and qualified alongside .

Middle Asia
All the others withdrew, so  and  qualified automatically.

Southeast Asia

The 4th Southeast Asia Basketball Association Championship is the qualifying tournament for the 2001 ABC Championship. the two best teams qualifies for 2001 ABC Championship. The tournament was held at Manila, Philippines.

Preliminary round

Group A

Group B

Classification 5th–7th

Semifinals

5th place

Final round

Semifinals

3rd place

Final

Final standing

West Asia
The 2000 West Asia Basketball Association Championship and 2001 West Asia Basketball Association Championship are the qualifying tournament for the 2001 ABC Championship. the two best teams after the second tournament qualifies for 2001 ABC Championship. The 2000 tournament was held at Beirut, Lebanon while Amman, Jordan hosted the 2001 edition.

External links
FIBA Asia official website 

2001
qualification
SEABA Championship
West Asian Basketball Championship